was a Japanese muraji and mother of Fujiwara no Momokawa, whose daughter became the Empress (posthumously) of Emperor Heizei, the 51st emperor of Japan. She married Fujiwara no Umakai, who died in 737, five years after Momokawa was born.

In the third month of Tenpyō 11 (739), she had an affair with Isonokami no Otomaro and was sent to Shimōsa Province. This caused a scandal which caused Isonokami to lose his standing and influence. In the sixth month of Tenpyō 12 (740), she was summoned to Kyoto, offered amnesty, and appointed to the rank of  within the imperial court. She eventually moved up to the rank of   before she died in the sixth month of Hōki 11 (780).

Between 733 and 741, she exchanged poetry with Atsumi no Ōkimi under the name . These can be found in volume eight of the Man'yōshū.

References

780 deaths
People of Nara-period Japan
Place of birth unknown
Place of death unknown
Date of birth unknown
Japanese women poets